The San Fernando Mission Cemetery is a Catholic cemetery located in the Mission Hills community of the San Fernando Valley of Los Angeles. The property adjoins the San Fernando Mission and Bishop Alemany Catholic High School.

The San Fernando Mission Cemetery has been owned and operated by the Los Angeles Archdiocese since the founding of the Mission and first burials in 1797.
Mission Hills Catholic Mortuary is also located on the grounds of the cemetery. San Fernando Mission Cemetery is an active cemetery providing burials, entombments and cremation options to members of the Catholic Faith and their families. Pets, picnicking, the consumption of alcohol and photography are all prohibited on the cemetery grounds at all times.

Art by Isabel Piczek
Four mosaics by ecclesiastical artist Isabel Piczek were created to adorn a mid-century style mausoleum. Two of the pieces are dated in the mosaic, 1963 and 1964.

List of notable interments and their families

A
 Philip Abbott (1924–1998), actor
 Edward Arnold (1890–1956), actor
 Michele Yvette Avila (1968–1985), murder victim

B
 Charles Beaumont (1929–1967), author and screenwriter
 Scotty Beckett (1929–1968), actor
 Ed Begley (1901–1970), actor
 William Bendix (1906–1964), actor
 Larry J. Blake (1914–1982), actor
 Loretta Blake (1898–1981) actress
 Walter Brennan (1894–1974), actor
 Evelyn Brent (1899–1975), actress
 George Burditt (1923–2013), television director

C
 Candy Candido (1913–1999), actor and voice-over artist
 Bobby Chacon (1951–2016), boxer
 Jerry Colonna (1904–1986), actor and comedian
 Betty Compson (1897–1974), actress
 Chuck Connors (1921–1992), actor
 Carmine (1910–1991) and Italia Coppola (1912–2004), parents of filmmaker Francis Ford Coppola.
 Henry Corden (1920–2005), actor and voice-over artist
 Joseph Crehan (1883–1966), actor

D
 Lee de Forest (1873–1961), physicist & electrical engineer, inventor of the triode
 Roy Del Ruth (1893–1961), movie director
 Carmen Dragon (1914–1984), composer and conductor, father of Daryl Dragon
 Tom Dugan (1889–1955), actor
 Allan Dwan (1885–1981), director, producer, screenwriter

F
 Frank Faylen (1905–1985), actor
 Dick Foran (1910–1979), actor
 Harry Fox (1882–1959), stage and movie star, "Fox-Trot" dance inventor
 William Frawley (1887–1966), actor

G
 Anita Garvin (1907–1994), actress
 Bert Glennon (1893–1967), cinematographer
 George Gobel (1919–1991), actor and comedian
Peter Graves (1926-2010), actor

H
 William Haade (1903–1966), actor
 Ray Heindorf (1908–1980), composer
 Pat Hogan (1920–1966), actor
 Bob Hope (1903–2003), actor and comedian
 Dolores Hope (1909–2011), singer and wife of Bob Hope
 Carol Hughes (1910–1995), actress, wife of Frank Faylen

J
 Alice Joyce (1890–1955), actress

K
 Bob Kelley (1917–1966), sportscaster
 Dorothea Kent (1916–1990), actress
 Peggy Knudsen (1923–1980), actress

L
 Rosemary LaPlanche (1923–1979), actress
 Charles Lamont (1895–1993), director
 Winnie Lightner (1899–1971), actress, comedian and singer
 Richard Loo (1903–1983), actor
 Edmund Lowe (1892–1971), actor
 Ken Lynch (1910–1990), actor

M
 Michael Maltese (1908–1981), animation screenwriter
 Robert L. Manahan (1956-2000), actor
 Adele Mara (1923–2010), actress
 June Marlowe (1903–1984) (original burial site; remains later moved to Cathedral of Our Lady of the Angels)
 Bob May (1939–2009), actor and stuntman
 Kathryn Minner (1892–1969), actress
 Lee Moran (1888–1961), actor

N
 Clarence Nash (1904–1985), voice-over artist
 Fred Niblo Jr. (1903–1973), screenwriter, son of Fred Niblo
 Thomas Noonan (1921–1968), actor and comedian
 Eva Novak (1898–1988), actress, sister of Jane Novak
 Jane Novak (1896–1990), actress, sister of Eva Novak
 Jay Novello (1904–1982), actor

O
 Henry O'Neill (1891–1961), actor
 Ernie Orsatti (1902–1968), major league baseball player
 Artie Ortego (1890–1960), actor

P
 William H. Parker (1905–1966), police chief of Los Angeles
 William Perkins (1947–1967), Cpl, USMC Medal of Honor Recipient
 Paul Picerni (1922–2011), actor

Q
 Eddie Quillan (1907–1990), actor
 Bill Quinn (1912–1994), actor

R
 Jobyna Ralston (1900–1967), actress
 Ted Fio Rito (1900–1971), musician
 Estelita Rodriguez (1928–1966), actress

S
 Teddy Sampson (1895–1970), actress
 Olga San Juan (1927–2009), actress
 Trinidad Silva (1950–1988), actor
 Penny Singleton (1908–2003), actress and first female president of an AFL–CIO union

T
 Gloria Talbott (1931–2000), actress
 Felipe Turich (1898–1992), actor, husband of Rosa Turich
 Rosa Turich (1903–1998), actress, wife of Felipe Turich

V
 Ritchie Valens (1941–1959), singer

W
 James Westerfield (1913–1971), actor
 Michael Whalen (1902–1974), actor
 Frank Wilcox (1907–1974), actor
 Jane Wyatt (1910–2006), actress

See also

 
 
 History of the San Fernando Valley

External links
 
 
 

 
Cemeteries in Los Angeles
Mission San Fernando Rey de España Cemetery
Lists of burials by location
Roman Catholic cemeteries in California
Roman Catholic Archdiocese of Los Angeles
Mission Hills, Los Angeles